"Jeeps, Lex Coups, Bimaz & Benz" is the first single released from the Lost Boyz's debut album, Legal Drug Money in the previous year of its release a little after the final recording. The song was produced by Easy Mo Bee, who also produced the group's second single, "Lifestyles of the Rich & Shameless

The song was hit on the rap charts in both 1995 and 1996, peaking at number 11 on the Billboard Hot Rap Singles, though it failed to achieve crossover success on the Billboard Hot 100, reaching number 67 on the chart.

Rapper Lil' Kim sampled the song on her 2003 single "The Jump Off"

Single track listing

A-Side
"Jeeps, Lex Coups, Bimaz & Benz" (LP Version) - 4:30
"Jeeps, Lex Coups, Bimaz & Benz" (Sparks Meets Dawg Mix) - 4:44

B-Side
"Jeeps, Lex Coups, Bimaz & Benz" (Dat Nigga Mix) - 4:10
"Keep It Real" - 4:43

Chart history

1995 debut singles
1995 songs
Lost Boyz songs
Uptown Records singles
Song recordings produced by Easy Mo Bee
Songs written by Mr. Cheeks